is a town in Suntō District of Shizuoka Prefecture, Japan. ,  the town had an estimated population of 32,453 in 14058 households, and a population density of 3,700 persons per km2.

Geography
Shimizu is located at the northern end of Izu Peninsula. Both the Kakita River and the Kano River flow through the town. The area has a temperate maritime climate with hot, humid summers and mild, cool winters.

Neighboring municipalities
Shizuoka Prefecture
Numazu
Mishima
Nagaizumi

Demographics
Per Japanese census data, the population of Shimizu has been increasing over the past 70 years.

Climate
The city has a climate characterized by hot and humid summers, and relatively mild winters (Köppen climate classification Cfa).  The average annual temperature in Shimizu is 15.8 °C. The average annual rainfall is 1925 mm with September as the wettest month. The temperatures are highest on average in August, at around 26.6 °C, and lowest in January, at around 5.8 °C.

History
Shimizu is located in the far eastern portion of former Suruga Province, and was largely tenryō territory under direct control of the Tokugawa shogunate in the Edo period. With the establishment of the modern municipalities system of the early Meiji period in 1889, the area was reorganized into the village of Shimizu within Suntō District, Shizuoka through the merger of 11 small hamlets.

Shimizu attained town status in 1963. There have been numerous unsuccessful attempts to merge Shimizu into neighboring Numazu (1966, 1967, 1996, 2003, 2004, 2006 and 2007).

Economy
The economy of Shimizu is largely based on agriculture. The town also serves as a bedroom community for the industrial zones in neighboring Numazu and Mishima.

Education
Shimizu has three public elementary schools and two public junior high schools operated by the town government. The town has one public high school operated by the Shizuoka Prefectural Board of Education.

Transportation

Railway
Shimizu does not have any passenger railway service.

Highway

Mascot

He is a elf who lives in the Kakita River. He wears a Mount Fuji-like hat and a cape with Kakita River and Mishimabaikamo flower motifs. His uniform has a pocket that can store green rice (a special kind of rice) and several books. Depending on the season, he changes his hat (white and green for spring, green for summer, white and brown for fall and white for winter) and his gloves and boots (red for spring, blue for summer, brown for fall and white for winter). His job is a park ranger. As a park ranger, he must protect the Kakita River (and nature in general) while making everyone's dreams come true. He is unveiled on 11 May 2013.

Sister cities
 Miaoli City, Taiwan, since 2003 
 Squamish, British Columbia, Canada

Notable people from Shimizu, Shizuoka
 Suguru Iwazaki, Japanese Nippon Professional Baseball pitcher for the Hanshin Tigers in Japan's Central League
 Yoshio Mochizuki, Japanese politician of the Liberal Democratic Party, a former member of the House of Representatives in the Diet (national legislature), and a Minister of the Environment
 Kwon Hyi-ro, Zainichi Korean murderer who brought public attention to discrimination against the Zainichi Koreans in Japan
 Yuki Sato, Japanese long-distance runner
 Kosuke Kato, former Japanese professional baseball pitcher
 Carlos Amano, Japanese retired professional wrestler (Real Name: Rieko Amano, Nihongo: 天野 理恵子, Amano Rieko)
 Masatoshi Kurata, Japanese politician of the Liberal Democratic Party and a former member of the House of Representatives in the Diet (national legislature)
 Koichi Takemasa, Japanese politician, member of the House of Representatives in the Diet (national legislature) and a member of the Democratic Party of Japan
 Junya Sano, Japanese road bicycle racer
Mariko Suga, wife of Yoshihide Suga, Prime Minister of Japan
Atsuto Uchida, Japanese professional Football Player

Local attractions
Kakita River

References

External links
 

 
Towns in Shizuoka Prefecture